Appointment with Fear, also known as Deadly Presence, is a 1985 American horror film directed by Ramsey Thomas for Moustapha Akkad and Moviestore Entertainment.  The film stars  Michele Little, Douglas Rowe, Garrick Dowhen, and Kerry Remsen.

The film had theatrical release in 1985 by Galaxy International Pictures and release on VHS in October 1987 by International Video Entertainment, followed in 1991 by Live Entertainment.  Ramsey Thomas had his name removed from the project, replacing it with the pseudonym Alan Smithee.

Plot
A mysterious and unidentified man (Garrick Dowhen) in a white Ford van gets out and stabs his wife on the portico of a house. Before she dies, she gives her infant son to Heather (Kerry Remsen) and urges her that he must be kept safe, knowing that his father will try to kill him. The case is followed by  Detective Kowalski (Douglas Rowe), an off-beat, seedy looking detective. Kowalski later finds out the killer is in solitary confinement in the state mental facility but is somehow leaving his body in spirit and is under an Ancient Egyptian curse which gives him a need to kill his son to be "King of the Forest" for another year. Kowalski later visits a specialist seeking advice on how to confront the Ancient Egyptian spirit and curse. Carol (Michele Little), a friend of Heather with a love of recording sounds, spots the white van following her in her pickup truck and becomes suspicious. She informs her love interest Bobby (Michael Wyle) of her fears and he dismisses them and punctures the tire of the van which is parked nearby.

Heather takes the baby to a luxury mansion house, where she takes care of him with Carol. She has a dream in which she predicts the murder of the boy and becomes extremely anxious. Detective Kowalski meanwhile has his car hijacked in the wilderness by the killer’s spirit and blown to smithereens. The killer learns of his son's whereabouts and unknown initially to Carol,  kills another of her friends and an old vagrant who lives in the back of her truck at the house. He then murders Samantha (Pamela Bach), another of Carol's friends in the jacuzzi. After discovering Samantha, Carol runs outside with a shotgun and shoots at the white van, although the killer is not present. Then, after discovering the body of her other friend, Carol remarks that she thinks the killer is trying to kill the baby. Carol orders Bobby to go upstairs and to protect Heather and the baby and vows to "kill the bastard". Bobby discovers that Heather is missing and the baby is alone and then departs on his bike/side car and finds the detective. The killer breaks in through a window and is set on fire by Carol, prompting the spirit to leave the burning body and manifest himself again. The killer is then seen leaving the house with the baby in his arms and is confronted by Carol with a shot gun and orders him to give up the child. When he refuses and lays the baby down by a tree and attempts to perform a ritual, Carol shoots him several times, with no effect. Bobby and the detective arrive on the scene and the detective urges her to pierce the killer with a nearby pole. As she does so a dramatic scene occurs with a flash to the body in the mental ward and it explodes and is followed by a strong wind where the spirit had been. Bobby presents the baby in safe arms to Heather who remarks "Isn't he beautiful". As she looks away, supernatural green lights appear in the baby's eyes as the credits roll.

Partial cast
 Douglas Rowe as Detective Kowalski
 Michele Little as Carol
 Kerry Remsen as Heather
 Garrick Dowhen as The Man
 Pamela Bach as Samantha 
 James Avery as Connors
 Danny Dayton as Norman
 Mike Gomez as Joe "Little Joe"
 Debi Sue Voorhees as Ruth
 Peter Griffin as George 
 Michael Wyle as Bobby
 Vincent Barbour as The Cowboy
 Gertrude Clement as Old Woman 
 Nick Conti as Young Detective
 Brioni Farrell as Mrs. Sorenson
 Kathi Gibbs as Cleo 
 Charlotte Speer as Mrs. Pierce

References

External links
 
 

1985 films
1980s English-language films
1985 horror films
Films credited to Alan Smithee
American supernatural horror films
1980s American films